Aris Damianidis (born 3 March 1955) is a Greek former professional footballer who played as defender.

Club career
Damianidis started his career at a very young age initially at AO Petralona and then at Iraklis Nikias from where he was transferred to Egaleo in 1971. In his seven year at the club, he was a key player in the defensive line and one of the main contributors to their promotion to the first division in 1977. In the summer of the same year he was transferred to AEK Athens.

In his first season with the "yellow-blacks", he was a key of the team that reached the semi-finals of the UEFA Cup in 1977. He did not manage to establish himself as a starter since the competition with the star players of the time was very rough. In his three seasons at the club, he won two consecutive championships and a Cup, including a domestic double in 1978.

In 1980 after his contract with AEK was expired, he signed at Olympiacos for two seasons, winning as many league titles and a Cup, while also achieving his second domestic double in 1981.

In 1982 he returned to his beloved Egaleo and played for two seasons. In 1984 he played second division side, Proodeftiki for a year, before retiring at AE Nikaia in 1986, where he played in the fourth division of the country.

Honours

Egaleo
Beta Ethniki: 1976–77, 1982–83

AEK Athens
Alpha Ethniki: 1977–78, 1978–79
Greek Cup: 1977–78

Olympiacos
Alpha Ethniki: 1980–81, 1981–82
Greek Cup: 1980–81

References

1955 births
Living people
Greece international footballers
Association football defenders
Egaleo F.C. players
AEK Athens F.C. players
Olympiacos F.C. players
Proodeftiki F.C. players
Super League Greece players
Footballers from Athens
Greek footballers